Gunnar Roland Tjomlid (born 3 August 1974) is a Norwegian skeptic, secular humanist blogger, and author.

Early life 
Tjomlid was born to a Norwegian father and English mother in Dar-es-Salaam, Tanzania, where he lived until he was two years old. He then mostly resided in Tonstad in Sirdal municipality.

He was a Christian and a believer in some pseudosciences before becoming a skeptic and an atheist.

Blogging and podcasting 
He started the blog Unfiltered Perception in 2006, which changed name to Saksynt in 2013. 

He was on the panel of Norwegian podcast Saltklypa from 2010 to 2012.

In 2013 he published the book Placebodefekten which is about alternative medicine.

In 2010 he received the award Tordenbloggen and in 2014 he received an award in Vixen Blog Awards 2013.

Bibliography 
 Placebodefekten – Hvorfor alternativ behandling virker som den virker, Humanist Forlag 
 Håndbok i krisemaksimering

References

External links 
 Saksynt – The blog of Gunnar Tjomlid

1974 births
Living people
Norwegian health activists
Norwegian atheists
Norwegian humanists
Critics of alternative medicine
Norwegian bloggers
Norwegian people of English descent
Norwegian skeptics